Zhang Lifang (born January 3, 1982 in Henan) is a female Chinese softball player. She was part of fourth-placed team at the 2006 World Championship.

She also competed for Team China at the 2008 Summer Olympics in Beijing.

References
Profile

1982 births
Living people
Chinese softball players
Olympic softball players of China
Sportspeople from Henan
Softball players at the 2004 Summer Olympics
Softball players at the 2008 Summer Olympics
Asian Games medalists in softball
Softball players at the 2010 Asian Games
Softball players at the 2006 Asian Games

Asian Games silver medalists for China
Asian Games bronze medalists for China
Medalists at the 2006 Asian Games
Medalists at the 2010 Asian Games